Common millet is a common name for several plants and may refer to:

Panicum miliaceum (proso millet), referred to as a common millet in recent decades
Pennisetum glaucum (pearl millet), the most commonly cultivated millet
Setaria italica (foxtail millet), historically referred to as common millet